Tadaxa is a genus of moths of the family Erebidae. It was described by Nye in 1975.

Description
Palpi with second joint reaching above vertex of head. Third joint with a tuft of hair on the inner side. Antennae of male with long bristles and cilia. Thorax and abdomen smoothly scaled. Tibia naked. Forewings with veins 8 and 9 anastomosing (fusing) to form a short areole. Hindwings with vein 5 from middle of discocellulars. Cilia of both wings are crenulate (scalloped).

Species
Tadaxa bijungens (Walker, 1865) Sri Lanka
Tadaxa lilacina (Butler, 1889) Dharamshala
Tadaxa lintona (Swinhoe, 1901) Borneo

References

Calpinae